Mount Elden or Elden Mountain (Hopi: Hovi'itstuyqa) is located in central Coconino County northeast of Flagstaff, Arizona. It takes its name from one of the region's earliest Anglo settlers, John Elden, who, along with his family, established a homestead on the mountain's lower slopes and grazed sheep on the open grasslands below during the late 19th century.

Much of the vegetation on the southern and southeastern slopes of the mountain was destroyed by the human-caused Radio Fire in 1977 which burned .

Geology
Mount Elden is one of five large peripheral silicic volcanic features within the greater San Francisco Peaks volcanic system (part of the San Francisco volcanic field) which include the nearby Dry Lake Hills, the Hochderffer and White Horse Hills to the northwest, and O'Leary Peak to the northeast. Because these features developed within close proximity of the San Francisco Mountain strato-volcano there is a strong likelihood that each is a geologic subsidiary of the larger mountain.

Geologically, Mount Elden is a lava dome composed almost entirely of dacitic lava flows which emerged from several vents.  These features emerged as intrusive emplacements within sedimentary blocks or as viscous extrusive flows in which the younger flows partially covered the older, lower flows. Geologic evidence suggests that the eruption of the mountain, which occurred at linear vents along regional faults, was a non-explosive event that took place during several flow sequences.  Likewise, because of the high viscosity of the dacite, it is likely that the mountain formed in the short period of a few months' time.  The mountain's overlapping flows commonly take lobe-like shapes which display a variety of flow characteristics and features including concentric benches, spires, ramping shear fractures, longitudinal tension fractures, and conjugate shear fractures.

Positioned within the central part of Mount Elden, on the mountain's eastern and northwestern flanks, are two sedimentary blocks. Both of these blocks display characteristics of uplift that most likely occurred as dacitic magma intruded into the sedimentary strata at a shallow depth and uplifted the layers, causing them to dip away from the mountain.  These blocks of sedimentary material are unique to the mountain, which otherwise is uniformly composed of silicic dacite.

See also

 Elden Pueblo

References

External links

 USGS fact sheet about the San Francisco volcanic field
 Mount Elden at SummitPost.org.
 

Mountains of Arizona
Landforms of Coconino County, Arizona
Volcanoes of Arizona
Lava domes
Mountains of Coconino County, Arizona